The  doubles Tournament at the 2007 Guangzhou International Women's Open took place between 24 and 30 September on outdoor hard courts in Guangzhou, China. Peng Shuai and Yan Zi won the title, defeating Vania King and Sun Tiantian in the final.

Seeds

Draw

References
 Main Draw

2007 Doubles
Guangzhou International Women's Open - Doubles